Kidz Bop is an American children's music group composed like a music brand that produces family-friendly bowdlerized cover versions of pop songs and related media. Kidz Bop releases compilation albums that feature children covering clean versions of contemporary pop songs that chart high on the Billboard Hot 100 and/or receive heavy airplay from contemporary hit radio stations several months ahead of each album's release. Kidz Bop releases censored and substitute profane lyrics, however, critics have commented that this doesn't necessarily remove the adult themes from the music.

The concept was developed by Razor & Tie co-founders Cliff Chenfeld and Craig Balsam and released its first entry on October 9, 2001. Since its debut, Kidz Bop has sold over 21 million albums and has generated over 4.5 billion streams. Kidz Bop has expanded to include merchandise, music videos, a live touring division, and seeking talent search competitions.

Chart performance
The Kidz Bop Kids have been named Billboard's No. 1 Kids' Album Artist for ten consecutive years, including 2010, 2011, 2012, 2013, 2014, 2015, 2016, 2017, 2018, 2019, and 2020.

In December 2020, Spotify announced that The KIDZ BOP Kids are the top streamed artist in the US on the Spotify Kids app.

The KIDZ BOP Kids were included in Billboard's Top 100 Artist of the Decade for the 2010s (#75).

Kidz Bop 26, released on July 15, 2014, marked the franchise's 40th charting album on the Billboard 200. Since the brand's debut in 2001, more than 20 million Kidz Bop albums have been sold worldwide.

In November 2015, Billboard Magazine announced that the Kidz Bop Kids rank #4 on their list of artists with the Most Billboard 200 Top 10 Albums of all time. The Kidz Bop Kids rank higher than iconic artists such as Madonna and Bruce Springsteen, with 22 top 10 albums on the Billboard 200 Chart.

In 2015, Kidz Bop 29 debuted at No. 3 on the Top 200 chart. In the same year, the franchise moved 1.15 million units, or 23% of the entire kids music album category.

Kidz Bop has released the best-selling children's albums for several years; Kidz Bop 25 in 2014, Kidz Bop 27 in 2015, and Kidz Bop 31 in 2016.

Tours

Kidz Bop World Tour

The Kidz Bop World Tour was a nationwide rock concert for kids featuring a child and one adult performer/mc backed by a full rock band which kicked off in the fall of 2007 in Minneapolis at Target Center. It was funded, at least in part, by Karen Zerby. The ensembles were chosen from a nationwide talent search and featured Mary Sarah, Markelle Gay, Kristian Real, Davide Schiavone, Elizabeth Bashian, and Brianna Komadina. The tour traveled the upper Midwest and east coast comprising some 29 shows during a 6-month run.

2014 "Dream Big, Sing Loud" Tour
The Kidz Bop Kids' nationwide tour promoted Kidz Bop 26 in over 40 cities in 2014. Major markets included New York, Los Angeles, Dallas, Chicago, Atlanta and more. The final stop of their 2014 tour was at Radio City Music Hall, where the Kidz Bop Kids performed live to open for the Radio City Christmas Spectacular.

2015 "Make Some Noise" Tour
The national live tour hit over 50 cities in 2015, including New York, Boston, Dallas, Washington, Nashville, Baltimore, Seattle and Los Angeles. The tour was sponsored by Build-A-Bear Workshop's Honey Girls. Audience members at the Kidz Bop tour saw a special preview of the Honey Girls' debut music video at each show.

In August 2015, Kidz Bop announced that it was extending the "Make Some Noise" tour to include nine holiday performances. The holiday shows were added following the success of the "Make Some Noise" tour's spring and summer dates.

2016 "Life of the Party" Tour
In February 2016, Kidz Bop announced it was celebrating its 15th birthday with the "Life of the Party" tour. In March 2016, Kidz Bop announced a partnership with Live Nation to add summer amphitheater dates to the "Life of the Party" Tour. In Connecticut, the Kidz Bop Kids kicked off the summer shows on July 16 at the Toyota Oakdale Theater. Additional cities included Brooklyn, Charlotte, and Chicago.

2017 "Best Time Ever" Tour
In February 2017, Kidz Bop and Live Nation announced the launch of the "Best Time Ever" tour. The 2017 live tour visited more than 50 cities across the U.S. and include stops at BOK Center LegoLand, Greek Theatre (Los Angeles), Boardwalk Hall, Honda Center, Ford Amphitheater at Coney Island and many more. The tour was sponsored by Juicy Juice Splashers, and kicked off in April 2017.

2018 Kidz Bop Live Tour
Following the success of 2017's "Best Time Ever" tour, Kidz Bop and Live Nation announced the all-new North American Tour launch, "Kidz Bop Live 2018". The tour announcement coincided with the release of Kidz Bop 37. The summer leg kicked off in Toronto on June 1, 2018, and hit more than 50 cities, including Chicago, New York (Jones Beach), Los Angeles (Greek Theatre) and Boston (Leader Bank Pavilion).
Four Kidz Bop Kids perform live at each concert, which were produced by SRae Productions. The creative team behind "Kidz Bop Live 2018" has previously produced tours for Imagine Dragons, The Weeknd, Rascal Flatts and Pentatonix.

2019 Kidz Bop World Tour
In December 2018, Kidz Bop and Live Nation announced the launch of Kidz Bop World Tour 2019. The 2019 tour visited more than 50 cities across the United States, Australia, Germany, the United Kingdom, and Mexico. The tour was sponsored by Subway Fresh Fit For Kids, and kicked off April 20 at the Eventim Apollo in Hammersmith, London.

2022 Kidz Bop Live Tour
In January 2020, Kidz Bop announced they would be doing a national tour. The tour was rescheduled to 2022 due to the COVID-19 pandemic. It ran from July 19 to September 14, 2022.

Notable Kidz Bop alumni
Ross Lynch
Noah Munck
Olivia Holt
Zendaya – her song "Replay" later appeared as a LeapFrog exclusive on Kidz Bop 26
Elijah Johnson
Fin Argus
Spencer Locke – Kidz Bop: Everyone's a Star (DVD)
Becky G – her song "Shower" later appeared on Kidz Bop 27
Kiana Brown

International expansion

United Kingdom
In February 2017, Kidz Bop announced it was launching outside America for the first time and expanding to the UK. There will be a new lineup of British Kidz Bop Kids. Kidz Bop partnered with Universal Music Group, ITV, Crown Talent and Media Group, and Creative Artists Agency for the UK launch, with ITV featuring the group in an episode of its star search programme The Big Audition.

The first two albums, Kidz Bop and Kidz Bop 2018, were released in the UK on March 31 and November 10 of 2017 respectively. The third and fourth albums, Kidz Bop Summer '18 and Kidz Bop 2019, were released in the UK on 23 March and 7 December 2018 respectively. The fifth album, Kidz Bop 2020, was released in the UK on 15 November 2019. The sixth and seventh albums, Kidz Bop Party Playlist and Kidz Bop 2021, were released in the UK in June and October 2020 respectively. The eighth album, Kidz Bop All-Time Greatest Hits was released in the UK on 26 March 2021.
The ninth album, Kidz Bop 2022, was released in the UK on 22 October 2021.

Germany

Kidz Bop Germany and Kidz Bop Germany 2 were released in Germany on March 29 and September 6 of 2019 respectively. The third and fourth albums, Kidz Bop Party Playlist! and Kidz Bop 2021, were released on April 3 and October 23 of 2020 respectively. The fifth album, Kidz Bop All-Time Greatest Hits was released on March 26, 2021. The sixth album, Kidz Bop 2022, was released on October 22, 2021.

France
Kidz Bop 2022 was released in France on October 22, 2021, and was performed by the first lineup of French Kidz Bop kids.

Mexico
Kidz Bop 2022 was released in Mexico on October 22, 2021, and was performed by the first lineup of Spanish speaking Kidz Bop kids.

Criticism and controversy
Three months preceding the release of Kidz Bop 10 in 2006, the online tracklist was revealed to feature a cover of Fall Out Boy's "Dance, Dance". After finding out that Kidz Bop can use a song without the original artist's permission but needs their approval to change the lyrics, bassist Pete Wentz responded by requesting the removal of the cover due to the song's sexual overtones, to which Razor & Tie obliged and re-released the tracklist, eliminating "Dance, Dance".

A 2017 study on censorship in Kidz Bop found that replacing words and phrases in songs does not disassociate the original in the minds of young listeners who have heard the uncensored song, and that "repackaging adult music as kids' music" does not remove the adult themes even when words or phrases are substituted. Christopher Bell, an associate professor of media studies at the University of Colorado has called Kidz Bop "an abomination" because it censors language but not content, altering specific words without changing or obscuring the underlying tone or meaning. He explained: "I don't need a sanitized version of "Despacito" — I need 8-year-olds not to be singing "Despacito" because that [song] is super dirty. And Kidz Bop doesn't always make that distinction."

Albums

Related projects

Kidz Bop experience at Hard Rock Hotel & Casino Punta Cana
In 2018, Kidz Bop announced the fully branded "Kidz Bop Experience" at Hard Rock Hotel & Casino Punta Cana.

They opened a Kidz Bop experience at Hard Rock Riviera Maya in August 2019.

Legoland music partnership
In 2016 Legoland Florida appointed Kidz Bop as its official music partner, coinciding with the launch of Lego Ninjago World, on January 12, 2017. To celebrate the park's expansion, the Kidz Bop Kids recorded an original version of the park's (and the TV show's) theme song.

Crazy 8 fashion brand
Kidz Bop partnered with kids' clothing brand, Crazy 8 to launch the Kidz Bop clothing line. The line was designed by Crazy 8. The collection is made for babies, children and early adolescents. The line officially went on sale on November 7, 2016, in Crazy 8 stores and online. The Kidz Bop performers wore the collection on stage during their 2016 Life Of The Party tour.

Kidz Star USA talent search
In 2010, Kidz Bop launched Kidz Star USA, a national talent search for kids aged 15 and under.

In 2011, Kiana Brown from Phoenix, Arizona, became the second winner and received a recording contract from RCA Records. American Idol (Season 8) winner, Kris Allen, was a celebrity judge and mentor for the competition.

Dallas Wayde was the 2012 Winner with Gavin Degraw as his celebrity mentor.

Isabel Lacatus was the 2013 winner with Jennette McCurdy as her celebrity mentor.

SiriusXM Radio
In January 2012, Kidz Bop launched its first radio show on SiriusXM Radio. Kidz Bop Block Party airs every Friday at 6pm est on Kids Place Live (Channel 69). In January 2014, Kidz Bop and SiriusXM Launched Kidz Bop Radio, a 24/7 channel dedicated to playing Kidz Bop music (Channel 77).

Video games
Kidz Bop Dance Party: The Video Game – September 2010 (Wii U and Wii)

See also
Kidsongs
The Wiggles

References

External links

 Official website

2001 establishments in the United States
Compilation album series
Cover bands
Child musical groups